Malindi Airport  is an airport in Kenya.

Location
It is located west of the central business district of the town of Malindi, in Kilifi County, in southeastern Kenya, at the Indian Ocean coast. The coordinates of Malindi Airport are 03°12'54.0"S, 40°06'00.0"E (Latitude:-3.2150; Longitude:40.1000).

Overview
The Kenyan government funded the updating and expansion of Malindi Airport terminal building, construction of a new control tower and rehabilitation of the runways. The upgrades were carried out by Dickways Construction, between 2011 and 2012 and cost KES:200 million (approx. USD2 million).

Future expansion
The Kenyan government seeks to expand Malindi Airport in order to attract direct international flights. In 2016 work began to enlarge the apron to accommodate more aircraft, build a  perimeter fence and construct a parking facility that accommodates 500 vehicles. That phase is expected to conclude in December 2016. The work has been delayed by some individuals and groups demanding compensation for land required for the expansion.

Airlines and destinations

References

External links

  Location of Malindi Airport At Google Maps
  Website of Kenya Airports Authority
 

Airports in Kenya
Malindi
Kilifi County